Abhaipur railway station is a railway station on Sahibganj loop line under the Malda railway division of Eastern Railway zone. It is situated beside Jamalpur-Kajra Road at Chaukra, Abhaipur in Lakhisarai district in the Indian state of Bihar.

References

External links
Station Details

Railway stations in Lakhisarai district
Malda railway division